Organizations that joined together on August, 1944 to form the National Council of Nigeria and the Cameroons:

 T.U.C. of Nigeria
 National Democratic Party
 Associated Press (Zikist)
 Demobilized Soldiers Union
 Calabar Improvement League
 Lagos Market Women Union
 Ebute Butchers Union (Lagos)
 Tailors Union of Nigeria
 Bamenda Improvement Association
 Nigerian Union of Students
 Yaba Estate Social Club
 Ahoada District Union
 Council of Ijebu National Societies
 Ekpoma Progress Union
 Ezi Wlefare League
 Igbotako Progressive Society
 Igbanke Union
 Ijebu Igbo Patriotic Society
 Ila Patriotic Union
 Ipetu Improvement Union
 Kwale Improvement Union
 West African Union of Seamen
 Nigeria Reconstruction Group
 Youths Literary Improvement
 Association of Master Tailors
 Commercial Biz League
 Farmers Committee of West Africa
 Akure Federal Union
 Council of Ijesha Societies
 Enugu Divisional Union
 Ishan Progress Union
 Ekpoma Progress Union
 Ezi Wlefare League
 Igbotako Progressive Society
 Igbanke Union
 Ijebu Igbo Patriotic
 Ila Patriotic Union
 Ipetu Improvement Union
 Kwale Improvement Union Seamen
 Nigeria Reconstruction Group
 Youths Literary Improvement
 Association of Master Tailors
 Commercial Biz League
 Farmers Committee of West Africa
 Akure Federal Union
 Council of Ijesha Societies
 Egbado Improvement Union
 Enugu Divisional Union
 Ekiti Parapo Society
 Mbaise Union
 Edo National Union

References
 Two Nigerian Lists. African Affairs  Vol. 44, No. 177 1945

Nigeria politics-related lists
Cameroon politics-related lists